Canton Township is one of twenty townships in Benton County, Iowa, USA.  As of the 2000 census, its population was 847.

History
Canton Township was founded in 1846.

Geography
According to the United States Census Bureau, Canton Township covers an area of 35.4 square miles (91.68 square kilometers); of this, 35.29 square miles (91.41 square kilometers, 99.71 percent) is land and 0.11 square miles (0.27 square kilometers, 0.29 percent) is water.

The city of Shellsburg is entirely within this township geographically but is a separate entity.

Adjacent townships
 Benton Township (north)
 Shellsburg Township (northeast)
 Fayette Township, Linn County (east)
 Clinton Township, Linn County (southeast)
 Fremont Township (south)
 Eldorado Township (southwest)
 Eden Township (west)
 Taylor Township (northwest)

Cemeteries
The township contains these three cemeteries: Oakwood, Parkers Grove and Shellsburg.

Landmarks
 Pleasant Creek State Park (vast majority)

School districts
 Benton Community School District
 Vinton-Shellsburg Community School District

Political districts
 Iowa's 3rd congressional district
 State House District 39
 State Senate District 20

References
 United States Census Bureau 2007 TIGER/Line Shapefiles
 United States Board on Geographic Names (GNIS)
 United States National Atlas

External links
 US-Counties.com
 City-Data.com

Townships in Benton County, Iowa
Cedar Rapids, Iowa metropolitan area
Townships in Iowa
1846 establishments in Iowa Territory